The 2003–04 Grand Prix of Figure Skating Final was an elite figure skating competition held at the World Arena in Colorado Springs, Colorado, United States from December 11 to 14, 2003. Medals were awarded in men's singles, ladies' singles, pair skating, and ice dancing.

The Grand Prix Final was the culminating event of the ISU Grand Prix of Figure Skating series, which consisted of Skate America, Skate Canada International, Cup of China, Trophée Éric Bompard, Cup of Russia, and NHK Trophy competitions. The top six skaters from each discipline competed in the final.

Results

Men

Ladies

Pairs

Ice dancing

External links
 
 http://articles.latimes.com/2003/dec/14/sports/sp-newswire14
 https://www.nytimes.com/2003/12/14/sports/sports-briefing.html

2003 in figure skating
Grand Prix of Figure Skating Final
Grand Prix of Figure Skating Final
2003 in sports in Colorado